Nelva Gonzales Ramos (born August 22, 1965) is a United States district judge of the United States District Court for the Southern District of Texas.

Early life and education
Ramos was born in 1965 in Port Lavaca, Texas. She attended Texas State University, where she graduated with a Bachelor of Arts summa cum laude in 1987. Ramos then earned her Juris Doctor from the University of Texas School of Law in 1991.

State judicial service
In 2011, Ramos became the 347th District Court judge.

Federal judicial service
During the 111th Congress, Ramos was one of three candidates recommended by Democrats from the Texas House delegation for a Corpus Christi vacancy on the United States District Court for the Southern District of Texas. Ramos was the only candidate also supported by Republican Senators Kay Bailey Hutchison and John Cornyn. On January 26, 2011, President Barack Obama nominated Ramos to replace Judge Hayden Head. The United States Senate confirmed Ramos by unanimous consent on August 2, 2011. She received her commission on August 4, 2011.

Notable rulings
In August 2016, Judge Ramos ruled in a case accusing the state of misleading voters without IDs. Ramos ruled that the U.S. Department of Justice alleged officials used news releases, a website and resources for training election officials to narrow "dramatically the scope of voters protected".

On April 10, 2017, Judge Ramos ruled that Texas' voter ID law was passed in 2011 with the intent to discriminate against minority voters. On April 27, 2018, the Fifth Circuit Court of Appeals reversed Ramos' ruling, upholding the Texas voter ID law in a 2–1 vote.

See also
List of Hispanic/Latino American jurists

References

External links

1965 births
Hispanic and Latino American judges
Judges of the United States District Court for the Southern District of Texas
Living people
People from Port Lavaca, Texas
Texas State University alumni
United States district court judges appointed by Barack Obama
21st-century American judges
University of Texas School of Law alumni
Texas state court judges
21st-century American women judges